Ioan Leonard Nemțanu (born 28 November 1973) is a Romanian former football defender.

Honours
Steaua București
Divizia A: 1996–97
Cupa României: 1996–97
Rocar București
Cupa României runner-up: 2000–01
Național București
Cupa României runner-up: 2002–03

References

1973 births
Living people
Romanian footballers
Association football defenders
Liga I players
Liga II players
FC Politehnica Iași (1945) players
FC Petrolul Ploiești players
AFC Rocar București players
FC Steaua București players
ASC Oțelul Galați players
FC Progresul București players
FC Argeș Pitești players
CSM Ceahlăul Piatra Neamț players